Ripuk is a local name for one of the highland pastures in Barun Valley where locals set up their temporary seasonal settlements.

Centuries ago, the river Barun used to be a glacier there, flowing to the north composing this lush green valley for today.

See also 

 Barun Valley
 Makalu
 Makalu Barun National Park

Valleys of Nepal